Alexander Sergeyevich Lenkov (17 May 1943 – 21 April 2014) was a Soviet-Russian film, stage and voice actor. He is probably best known for his voice acting in animated films and dubbing the foreign movies to Russian. He is the Russian voice of Mundungus Fletcher in Harry Potter and the Deathly Hallows – Part 1 (2010).

Alexander Lenkov was born in the town of Rasskazovo in Tambov Oblast, Russia, in 1943. His family soon moved to Moscow where he had lived ever since. In 1961–64 studied at the school-studio of Yuri Zavadsky at the Mossovet Theatre. Upon graduation Lenkov became an actor of the Mossovet Theatre.

Lenkov was a character actor whose career spanned over five decades. He starred in over a hundred feature and television films and in over 60 theatre productions. Taught at Gerasimov Institute of Cinematography (VGIK) in 2004–2014.

In 2001 he received two TEFIs for his work on television. Was awarded the Honored Artist of Russia in 1980 and the People's Artist of Russia in 1997.

He was married to his childhood sweetheart Elena from the early 1960s until his death. The couple had a daughter Ekaterina (b. 1969) together.

Lenkov died from a long illness on 21 April 2014 in Moscow, aged 70. He was buried at the Troyekurovskoye Cemetery in Moscow.

Filmography 

 1964 — Uninvented Story  as Felix Fonyakov
 1964 — Spring Troubles (Весенние хлопоты) as Radik
 1964 — The Keys of Skies (Ключи от неба) as Semyon Lagoda
 1965 — Give Me a Book of Complaints (Дайте жалобную книгу) as Pavlik
 1966 — Royal Regatta (Королевская регата) as Lyonya
 1971 — Bat'ka (Батька) as Sashok
 1972 — We Wait You, Boy (Ждём тебя, парень) as Petka 
 1973 — Break a Leg! (Ни пуха, ни пера) as Pyotr
 1973 — Vasili Tyorkin (Василий Тёркин, TV) as Vasili Tyorkin
 1974 — Teens in the Universe (Отроки во Вселенной) as Executor Robot
 1974 — Unforgotten Song (Незабытая песня) as Kurchonok
 1974—2013 — Yeralash (Ералаш, TV show) as different characters
 1975 — '29 Spring (Весна двадцать девятого) as Maksim
 1975 — Circus in the Circus as Alyosha
 1976 — Po sekretu vsemu svetu (По секрету всему свету) as Deniska's dad
 1976 — Mark Twain Stories (Рассказы Марка Твена) as reporter
 1976 — Soldier And Mother (Солдат и мать) as Soldier
 1977 — Vacation, Which Did Not Take Place (Отпуск, который не состоялся) as Andrey Ukhtomski
 1978 — Schedule For After Tomorrow (Расписание на послезавтра) as Igor Nikolaevich
 1979 — Spring Olympic Games, Or Chorus Chief (Весенняя Олимпиада, или Начальник хора) as Ryzhkin
 1980 — And Endless Battle... From The Alexander Blok Life (И вечный бой... Из жизни Александра Блока)
 1980 — Extraordinary Circumstances (Чрезвычайные обстоятельства) as Sasha Kulagin
 1981 — Ugly Elsa (Безобразная Эльза, TV) as Pertti Oras
 1982 — Take Him Alive (Взять живым) as Ptitsyn
 1982 — Whose You Are, Old Stuff? (Вы чьё, старичьё?) as Valerian
 1983 — Black and White Magic (Магия чёрная и белая) as Valentin Dmitrievich
 1983 — Adventures of Petrov and Vasechkin, Usual and Incredible (Приключения Петрова и Васечкина, обыкновенные и невероятные) as Strange Yardman
 1984 — Makar the Pathfinder (Макар-следопыт) as Timofei
 1985 — Winter Cherry (Зимняя вишня) as Veniamin
 1986 — Snow Queen Mystery (Тайна Снежной Королевы) as Snowman
 1987 — Mysterious Inheritor (Загадочный наследник) as Gryaznov
 1988 — Little Vera (Маленькая Вера) as Mikhail Petrovich
 1988 — Island of Rusty General (Остров Ржавого генерала) as Robot Baba Yaga
 1989 — There Are Dark Nights In The Sochi City (В городе Сочи тёмные ночи) as Lena's father
 1989 — The Village of Stepanchikovo And Its Inhabitants (Село Степанчиково и его обитатели) as Yezhevikin
 1989 — Cowberries In The Forest (Во бору брусника) as Kirill
 1990 — Sanit Zone (Сэнит зон) as Zykin
 1991 — Talking Monkey (Говорящая обезьяна) as Maryin
 1991 — Funeral On Second Floor (Похороны на втором этаже) as Burry
 1991 — Devil Incarnate (Исчадье ада) as Heinrich
 1992 — Good Night (Доброй ночи) as Slavik
 1992 — Spiderweb (Паутина) as Grisha
 1992 — Tractor Drivers 2 (Трактористы 2) as Muscovite
 1993 — No Tricks, Please! (Давайте без фокусов!) as Customer
 1993 — Love Desire (Желание любви) as Guest
 1993 — Silence Code (Кодекс Молчания 2) as Makarov
 1993 — Idiot's Dreams  (Мечты идиота) as Croupier
 1993 — About Foma The Businessman (Про бизнесмена Фому) as Comrade Basurmanov
 1994 — Winter Cherries 3 (Зимняя вишня 3) as Veniamin
 1995 — Tram In Moscow (Трамвай в Москве) as tram technician
 1995 — On the Corner, Near by Patriarch Ponds 2 (На углу, у Патриарших 2, TV series) as Arkady
 1996 — Agape (Агапе) as Pasha
 1996 — The Return of the Battleship (Возвращение броненосца) as Verka's boyfriend
 1996 — Pages of Theater Parody (Страницы театральной пародии) as Pierre d'Aurebour
 1996 — Strawberries (Клубничка, TV series) as Belyanchikov
 1998 — Prince Yuri Dolgorukiy (Князь Юрий Долгорукий) as Poacher
 1998 — The Barber of Siberia (Сибирский цирюльник) as scientist
 1999 — Directory of Death (Директория смерти) as astrologist
 2000 — Turetski's March (Марш Турецкого, TV series)  as Spirin
 2001 — Drakosha and Co. (Дракоша и компания) as Konovalov
 2002 — Ha! (Ха!, TV series) as different characters
 2002 — Provincialists (Провинциалы, TV series) as director
 2002 — Brigada (Бригада, TV series)  as episode
 2002 — Bad Habit (Дурная привычка) as Surgeon
 2002 — Alexander Pushkin (Александр Пушкин) as Bitkov
 2003 — Dark Horse (Тёмная лошадка) as Adam Borisovich
 2003 — Siberia Girl (Сибирочка) as Mr. Rosetti
 2003 — There is an Idea (Есть идея) as Kirich
 2004 — That Queen of Spade (Эта пиковая дама, TV) as Marek
 2004 — Reflections (Отражения) as episode
 2004 — Thieves and Prostitutes. Space Flight Is the Prize (Воры и проститутки. Приз — полёт в космос) as episode
 2004 — Hello, Dweeb! (Hello, Дохлый!) as doctor
 2005 — The Check Kiss (Контрольный поцелуй) as episode
 2005 — War Man (Человек войны) as Urban
 2006 — What Woman Wants (Чего хочет женщина) as episode
 2006 — The Pursuit of the Angel (Погоня за ангелом) as Homeless
 2006 — Paparazza (Папараца) as Aleksey Alekseevich
 2006 — Dad The Handyman (Папа на   все руки, TV series) as Neighbour
 2006 — Big Girls (Большие девочки) as Isaac Newton or Saveliy Piskunov
 2006 — Happiness Rails (Рельсы счастья, TV series) as Old man
 2008 — Yermolovs (Ермоловы, TV series) as Castle ward
 2009 — The Book of Masters (Книга мастеров) as senior gem-cutter
 2009 — Bullet is Fool 2 (Пуля-дура 2. Агент почти не виден) as Pavel Nikitich
 2010 — Toys (Игрушки, TV series) as Leopold Dormidontov
 2010 — Detective Samovarov (Сыщик Самоваров, TV series) as Yefim Moiseyevich
 2010 — Flowers From Liza (Цветы от Лизы) as Khariton
 2011 — Caramel (Карамель, TV series) as Lev Radkovich
 2012 — Interns (Интерны, TV series) as Natan Kupitman
 2012 — Da Girlz (Деффчонки, TV series) as Viktor Borisovich
 2013 — Teacher In Law (Учитель в законе, TV series) as Grey-haired

References

External links
 

1943 births
2014 deaths
Male actors from Moscow
Russian male film actors
Russian male stage actors
Russian male television actors
People's Artists of Russia
Soviet male film actors
Soviet male stage actors
Burials in Troyekurovskoye Cemetery
Deaths from stomach cancer